This is a list of mayors that served the city of Miskolc, Hungary.

 1990–1993 Tamás Csoba
 1993–1994 Ildikó T. Asztalos
 1994–2002Tamás Kobold
 2002–2010 Sándor Káli
 Since 2010 Ákos Kriza

See also

 List of Hungarians#History and politics
 List of people from Borsod-Abaúj-Zemplén
 Lists of mayors by country

External links 
 

Miskolc mayors
Miskolc